The Simon Memorial Prize is an award that honors 'distinguished work in experimental or theoretical low temperature physics'. The prize is awarded by the Institute of Physics and is presented at the International Conference on Low Temperature Physics, which takes place every three years. The prize is named after Francis Simon, who contributed eminently to the field of low-temperature physics.

Not to be confused with the Robert Simon Memorial Prize for "the Most Outstanding Doctoral Dissertation" from Columbia University.

Winners 
The following have won this prize:
 2020 Jukka Pekola
 2017 Louis Taillefer
 2014 Peter Wölfle
 2011 Sergey V. Iordanski and Nikolai B. Kopnin
 2008 Yasunobu Nakamura and Jaw-Shen Tsai
 2004 Grigory Volovik
 2001 Giorgio Frossati
 1998 George R. Pickett and Anthony M. Guénault
 1995 Alexander F. Andreev
 1992 Olivier Avenel and Eric Varoquaux
 1989 Richard A. Webb
 1986 Yuri V. Sharvin
 1983 David Olaf Edwards
 1981 Anthony James Leggett
 1976 David M. Lee and Douglas D. Osheroff and Robert C. Richardson
 1973 Peter Kapitza
 1970 Walther Meissner
 1968 Kurt Alfred Georg Mendelssohn
 1965 John Charles Wheatley
 1963 Henry Edgar Hall and William Frank Vinen
 1961 Ilya M. Lifschitz
 1959 Heinz London

See also
 Institute of Physics Awards
 List of physics awards
 List of awards named after people

References

Awards of the Institute of Physics